The Trinidad and Tobago cricket team, or officially the Trinidad and Tobago Red Force, is the representative cricket team of the country of Trinidad and Tobago.

The Red Force takes part in inter-regional cricket competitions in the Caribbean, such as the West Indies' Professional Cricket League (which includes the Regional Four Day Competition and the NAGICO Regional Super50) under the franchise name Trinidad and Tobago Red Force, with the best players selected for the West Indies team, which plays international cricket.

Team history

Teams from Trinidad played first-class cricket from 1869, when Trinidad took on Demerara for two matches, winning one and losing one. They also participated in the Inter-Colonial Tournament between Barbados, British Guiana (formerly Demerara), and themselves, playing in all 28 tournaments that were held between 1891–92 and 1938–39. From the late 1880s, Tobago was incorporated into the crown colony of Trinidad as a ward.

After independence in 1962, the team changed its name to reflect the official name of the country, Trinidad and Tobago, and when the Shell Shield began in 1965–66 the team competed under the name of Trinidad and Tobago. They won their first title on their fourth outing, in 1969–70, and also won the next year's competition, but since then Trinidad and Tobago have only taken three titles in 35 seasons. During this time cricketers from Trinidad competed in the Beaumont Cup which had first class status.

In one-day cricket, Trinidad and Tobago won four titles in eight seasons from 1989–90 to 1996–97, and also won the 2004–05 one-day title.

T&T cricket team participated and were runners-up at the inaugural Champions' league T-20. The team stayed unbeaten until the finals.

Squad

Coaching staff

 Head coach:  David Furlonge
 Asst. Coach:  Kelvin Williams
 Batting coach: n/a
 Bowling coach: n/a
 Fielding coach: n/a
 Manager: Sebastian Edwards
 Mental conditioning coach: Adarayll John
 Fitness trainer:  Clinton Jeremiah 
 Head Physiotherapist: n/a
 Masseur: n/a
 Performance analyst:  Amrit Jadoo

Notable players

The list of prominent cricketers who have represented Trinidad and Tobago includes:

 Learie Constantine
 Herman Griffith
 Clifford Roach
 Nelson Betancourt
 Jackie Grant
 Rolph Grant
 Jeffrey Stollmeyer
 Gerry Gomez
 Andy Ganteaume
 Sonny Ramadhin
 Simpson Guillen 
 Joey Carew
 Deryck Murray
 Charlie Davis
 Inshan Ali
 Raphick Jumadeen
 Bernard Julien
 Larry Gomes
 Gus Logie 
 Phil Simmons
 David Williams
 Ian Bishop
 Brian Lara
 Roland Holder
 Mervyn Dillon
 Dinanath Ramnarine
 Daren Ganga
 Ravi Rampaul
 Dave Mohammed
 Dwayne Bravo
 Denesh Ramdin
 Lendl Simmons
 Kieron Pollard
 Darren Bravo
 Sunil Narine
 Samuel Badree
 Robin Singh
 Jason Mohammed

Honours

 Regional Four Day Competition (5): 1969–70, 1970–71, 1975–76 (shared), 1984–85, 2005–06
 Domestic one-day competition (13): 1978–79, 1980–81, 1989–90, 1991–92, 1995–1996 (shared), 1996–1997, 2004–2005, 2006–2007, 2008–2009, 2009–2010, 2014–15, 2015–16, 2020–21
 Caribbean T20 (3): 2011, 2012, 2013 
Stanford 20/20 (defunct) (1): 2008
 Trans-Atlantic Twenty20 Champions Cup (Stanford Super Series) (defunct) (1): 2008
 Inter-Colonial Tournament (defunct) (12): 1901–02, 1903–04, 1907–08, 1909–10, 1921–22 (shared), 1924–25, 1925–26, 1928–29, 1931–32, 1933–34, 1936–37, 1938–39

Grounds
 Queen's Park Oval in Port of Spain 
 Guaracara Park in Pointe-à-Pierre 
 Brian Lara Cricket Academy near San Fernando
 National Cricket Centre in Couva 
 Sir Frank Worrell Memorial Ground at UWI St Augustine
 Shaw Park in Scarborough, Tobago

See also

Trinidad and Tobago women's cricket team
List of international cricketers from Trinidad and Tobago

References

National cricket teams
National cricket team
West Indian first-class cricket teams
M
C